Teck Corp Ltd v Millar, (1972), 33 DLR (3d) 288 (BCSC) is an important Canadian corporate law decision on a corporate director's fiduciary duty in the context of a takeover bid. Justice Thomas R. Berger of the British Columbia Supreme Court held that a director may resist a hostile take-over so long as they are acting in good faith, and they have reasonable grounds to believe that the take-over will cause substantial harm to the interests of the shareholders collective. The case was viewed as a shift away from the standard set in the English case of Hogg v. Cramphorn Ltd. (1963). Recent scholarship has made the following observation:

See also
 BCE Inc v 1976 Debentureholders

References

Canadian corporate case law
1972 in Canadian case law
1972 in British Columbia
British Columbia case law